The Baker City Gold Diggers was a primary moniker of the minor league baseball teams based in Baker City, Oregon between 1891 and 1914. Baker City teams played as members of the Pacific Interstate League in 1891, Inland Empire League in 1902, 1908 and Western Tri-State League in 1913 to 1914, using a different nickname each season.

History
Baker City, Oregon first hosted minor league play in 1891.  The Baker Bunch Grassers were one of four teams formed together as charter members of the Independent level Pacific Interstate League. The La Grande Grand Rhonders, Pendleton Ho Hos and Walla Walla Walla Wallas joined Baker City in league play.

The Baker Bunch Grassers began play in the Pacific Interstate League on June 6, 1891. Baker City finished last, playing under manager W. S. Bowers. The La Grande Grand Rhonders won the Pacific Interstate League championship with a 20–10 record. La Grande was followed by the Pendleton Giants/Ho Hos (18–12), Walla Walla Walla Wallas (16–14) and Baker Bunch Grassers (6–24) in the final Pacific Interstate League standings.

Baker City fielded a franchise as the 1902 Inland Empire League began play as a Class D level four–team league, with the Baker City Gold Diggers, La Grande Beetpullers, Pendleton Indians and Walla Walla Sharpshooters as charter members. The complete 1902 league standings and statistics are unknown. A game report noted Walla Walla defeated Baker 2–0 on July 25, 1902 in front of 300 fans at Baker. Another game report has Pendleton defeating La Grande 2–0 and Walla Walla defeating Baker 6–0 on August 25, 1902.

The team records on August 25, 1902 were reported to be: Pendleton 21–8, Walla Walla 14–15, La Grande 12–16 and Baker City 10–18.

The Inland Empire League formed again in 1908, with the same four cities hosting franchises, including Baker City. The Baker Nuggets/Miners, La Grande Babes, Pendleton Pets/Wheat Growers and Walla Walla Walla Wallas began league play on June 10, 1908. However, the league permanently disbanded on Sunday, July 12, 1908 due to extreme heat.

At the time the league folded in 1908, the La Grande Babes, with a 19–12 record were in 1st place 2.5 games ahead of the 2nd place Baker Nuggets/Miners, who finished with a record of 15–15 under managers Cryderman and Hosie. They were followed by the Walla Walla Walla Wallas (14–17) and Pendleton Pets/Wheat Growers (14–18) in the final standings. The Inland league did not return to play after the 1908 season.

In 1913, the Baker City Golddiggers began play as members of the six–team Class D level Western Tri-State League, but folded before the end of the season. The Golddiggers had a record of 15–40 under managers Con Harlow, Charles Harrod and Troeh when the franchise disbanded on June 23, 1913.

The Baker City Miners continued play in 1914 as members of the four–team the Western Tri-State League in the final minor league season for Baker City. The Miners finished in 3rd place with a 44–52 record under manager Karl King, 15.0 games behind the 1st place Pendleton Buckaroos.

Baker City, Oregon has not hosted another minor league team.

The ballpark
The name of the Baker City home minor league ballpark is not directly referenced. Geiser-Pollman Park was in use in the era as a private park and became the first public park in Baker City in 1908.

Timeline

Year–by–year records

Notable alumni
Ray French (1914)
Lou Mahaffey (1902)
Con Starkel (1913)
Suds Sutherland (1914)

See also
Baker City Golddiggers playersBaker City Miners players

References

External links
 Baseball Reference

Defunct minor league baseball teams
Defunct baseball teams in Oregon
Baseball teams established in 1902
Baseball teams disestablished in 1902
Baker City, Oregon
Baker County, Oregon
Inland Empire League teams